The Kala Ratna earlier Hamsa Award, is a civilian honour of the Andhra Pradesh state are conferred annually by the Government of Andhra Pradesh and is organised by the State Cultural Council and Department of Culture on the occasion of Telugu new year, Ugadi. The awards celebrate achievements by persons of eminence in their chosen fields. The awardees are from the fields of literature, music, dance, painting, sculpture, folk and tribal arts. Along with Kala Ratna awards, the Andhra Pradesh government presents Ugadi Puraskarams on the same stage.

The Award
The awards are presented  by the Chief Minister of Andhra Pradesh. Each award carries an amount of Rs. 30,000, a shawl, a gold plated Hamsa (Swan) memento.

Award winners

2015 Awards
The Government of Andhra Pradesh announced 32 names for the year 2015.

2016 Awards
The Government of Andhra Pradesh announced 23 names for the year 2016.

2017 Awards
The Government of Andhra Pradesh announced 38 names for the year 2017.

References

State awards and decorations of India
Culture of Andhra Pradesh
Indian art awards
Awards established in 1999
1999 establishments in Andhra Pradesh